Biggar Airport  is located adjacent to Biggar, Saskatchewan, Canada.

See also
List of airports in Saskatchewan

References

External links
 Page about this airport on COPA's Places to Fly airport directory

Registered aerodromes in Saskatchewan